The Deutsche Stiftung Denkmalschutz ("German Foundation for Monument Protection") is a German private initiative founded in 1985 that works for the preservation of cultural heritage in Germany and to promote the idea of cultural heritage management.

Background
Since 1900, when Georg Dehio published his Handbook of German Art Heritage, Germany has not had a central list of National Heritage Sites. Each of the sixteen states keeps their own set of lists and many towns and cities keep their own lists, all based on varying criteria for inclusion.

Monument protection

Denkmalschutz works to coordinate efforts, promote public awareness, and also to act as a central contact for worldwide organizations such as UNESCO World Heritage. They also organize and fund the European Heritage Days in Germany, which are called Tag des offenen Denkmals. This "open monument day" has been held yearly with a different theme since 1993 on the second Sunday of September. For example, in 2011 on September 11th, the theme Romanticism, Realism, Revolution - The 19th Century opened in Trier. 

Protecting heritage site homes with a listing in a regional Denkmalschutz list is not always appreciated by everyone, since such a listing may come with legal historic preservation obligations.   Other protected sites such as cobblestone streets can be seen as a nuisance for cyclists and wheelchairs. Many sites are marked with a tag according to the Hague Convention of 1954 regarding the protection of cultural heritage in times of armed conflict.

References

External links
Deutsche Stiftung Denkmalschutz
Deutsches Nationalkomitee für Denkmalschutz
www.denkmalliste.org List of Denkmal sites

Heritage organizations
Heritage sites in Germany
Charities based in Germany
Organisations based in Bonn
Organizations established in 1985
History organisations based in Germany
Non-profit organisations based in North Rhine-Westphalia
1985 establishments in West Germany